Gregorini is an Italian surname, derived from the name Gregorio. The Grégorini variant is the French rendering of the original Italian surname.

Notable people with this surname include:
 Damien Grégorini (born 1979), French football player
 Francesca Gregorini (born 1968), Italian-American director
 Giorgio Gregorini, Italian makeup artist
 Loretta Gregorini (born 1948), Italian astronomer

References